Slavic alphabet may refer to any of the following scripts designed specifically for writing Slavic languages (note: a number of Slavic languages, including all West Slavic and some South Slavic, are written in the Latin script):

 Glagolitic script
 Cyrillic script (also used for non-Slavic languages)
 Early Cyrillic alphabet
 Belarusian alphabet
 Bulgarian alphabet
 Macedonian alphabet
 Russian alphabet
 Rusyn alphabets
 Serbian Cyrillic alphabet
 Ukrainian alphabet
 "Cherty i rezy", a vague reference to non-attested pre-Christian Slavic writing
 Slavistic Phonetic Alphabet